The 2003 Tecate Telmex Monterrey Grand Prix was the second round of the 2003 CART World Series season, held on March 23, 2003 on the streets of Parque Fundidora in Monterrey, Nuevo León, Mexico.

Qualifying results

Paul Tracy and Jimmy Vasser missed the second qualification session after crashes damaged their cars during practice.  Patrick Carpentier missed the same session because of an illness, choosing to rest for the race on Sunday.

Race

Caution flags

Notes

 New Track Record Sébastien Bourdais 1:14.938 (Qualification Session #2)
 Average Speed 87.184 mph

External links
 Full Weekend Times & Results

Monterrey
Monterrey
Grand Prix of Monterrey
21st century in Monterrey